Scandium(III) sulfide is a chemical compound of scandium and sulfur with the chemical formula Sc2S3.  It is a yellow solid.

Structure
The crystal structure of Sc2S3 is closely related to that of sodium chloride, in that it is based on a cubic close packed array of anions. Whereas NaCl has all the octahedral interstices in the anion lattice occupied by cations, Sc2S3 has one third of them vacant. The vacancies are ordered, but in a very complicated pattern, leading to a large, orthorhombic unit cell belonging to the space group Fddd.

Synthesis
Metal sulfides are usually prepared by heating mixtures of the two elements, but in the case of scandium, this method yields scandium monosulfide, ScS. Sc2S3 can be prepared by heating scandium(III) oxide under flowing hydrogen sulfide in a graphite crucible to 1550 °C or above for 2–3 hours.  The crude product is then purified by chemical vapor transport at 950 °C using iodine as the transport agent.

Sc2O3 + 3H2S → Sc2S3 + 3H2O

Scandium(III) sulfide can be prepared by reacting scandium(III) chloride with dry hydrogen sulfide at elevated temperature:
2 ScCl3 + 3 H2S → Sc2S3 + 6 HCl

Reactivity
Above 1100 °C, Sc2S3 loses sulfur, forming nonstoichiometric compounds such as Sc1.37S2.

References

Sulfides
Scandium compounds
Inorganic compounds